Milomir Šešlija, also known as Milo (born 21 July 1964) is a Bosnian professional football manager and former player who is the manager.

Playing career
Šešlija began playing football for Yugoslav First League side Željezničar. After spending most of his career playing in the former Yugoslavia, he moved to Malaysia, where he would play for Kuala Lumpur and Sabah and in Singapore for Sembawang Rangers.

Managerial career
After Šešlija retired from playing football, he became a manager. In 2006, he won the First League of FBiH with Velež Mostar and got the club promoted to the Bosnian Premier League. In July 2013, he was named as the new manager of Sabah.

Šešlija was a runner-up in the 2016 Indonesia Soccer Championship A with Arema, and in 2019 won the Indonesia President's Cup with the club.

On 23 September 2020, he returned to Bosnia, becoming manager of First League of FBiH club Igman Konjic.

On 7 April 2022, he signed contract for Borneo.

Honours

Player
Sabah
Liga Perdana: 1996
Malaysia FA Cup: 1995

Manager
Velež Mostar
First League of FBiH: 2005–06

Arema
Indonesia President's Cup: 2019

References

External links
BiH Timovi u Yu ligi

1964 births
Living people
Footballers from Sarajevo
Serbs of Bosnia and Herzegovina
Association football defenders
Yugoslav footballers
Bosnia and Herzegovina footballers
FK Željezničar Sarajevo players
RFK Novi Sad 1921 players
FK Famos Hrasnica players
FK TSC Bačka Topola players
FK Sloboda Užice players
Kuala Lumpur City F.C. players
Sabah F.C. (Malaysia) players
Sembawang Rangers FC players
Yugoslav First League players
Singapore Premier League players
Bosnia and Herzegovina expatriate footballers
Expatriate footballers in Malaysia
Bosnia and Herzegovina expatriate sportspeople in Malaysia
Expatriate footballers in Singapore
Bosnia and Herzegovina expatriate sportspeople in Singapore
Bosnia and Herzegovina football managers
FK Slavija Sarajevo managers
FK Velež Mostar managers
Dhofar Club managers
Al-Seeb Club managers
FK Rudar Kakanj managers
Arema FC managers
Sabah F.C. (Malaysia) managers
Persiba Balikpapan managers
Pelita Jaya FC managers
FK Igman Konjic managers
Premier League of Bosnia and Herzegovina managers
Oman Professional League managers
Indonesia Super League managers
Bosnia and Herzegovina expatriate football managers
Expatriate football managers in Oman
Bosnia and Herzegovina expatriate sportspeople in Oman
Expatriate football managers in Indonesia
Bosnia and Herzegovina expatriate sportspeople in Indonesia
Expatriate football managers in Malaysia